Bridestowe Lavender Estate is a lavender farm located in Nabowla, Tasmania, Australia. The farm is believed to be the largest commercial plantation of Lavandula angustifolia in the world. Bridestowe was established in 1922 by Charles Denny, and advanced by his son, Tim Denny. It is named in honour of the birthplace of Charles Denny's wife, the English town of Bridestowe.

References

Companies based in Tasmania
Horticultural companies of Australia
Australian companies established in 1922
Agriculture companies established in 1922